Irving Gould (1919–2004) was a Canadian businessman credited with both saving and sinking Commodore.

Commodore was originally formed in Canada and initially produced mechanical typewriters and calculators. In 1965, Jack Tramiel, Commodore's founder and CEO, decided to purchase the Canadian store chain Wilson's Stationers to provide a sales channel for their products. To fund the purchase they borrowed $3 million from Atlantic Acceptance Corporation at an 11% interest rate. On 14 June 1965, Atlantic bounced a $5 million check and was insolvent within days. This led to all their capital loans being called in, including Commodore's $3 million.

Looking for a way out of the problem, Irving Gould arranged the sale of Wilson's Stationers to a US company. To pay off the bridge loan, Gould purchased 17% of Commodore's stock in 1966 for $400,000. Over the next decade, the company repeatedly had difficulties and repeatedly turned to Gould for funding.

Through the late 1960s and early 1970s, Japanese companies began introducing typewriters and calculators at price points Commodore could not match. Tramiel responded by moving into the newly emerging field of electronic calculators. Gould had a Japanese girlfriend and kept up on changes in Japanese industry. In the mid-1970s, Gould told Tramiel that the Japanese were starting to produce calculators using CMOS electronics that were going to "kick your butt". Tramiel visited Japan to examine their systems, and found they would not sell their technology to the US.

The Japanese companies were able to undercut Commodore both in technology and by being vertically integrated. Texas Instruments, one of Commodore's suppliers, decided to follow this pattern and introduced complete calculators at prices below what they sold the parts to Commodore. Gould provided funding to keep Commodore going during the period where they were being forced out of the calculator business. Tramiel responded by buying MOS Technology to supply microprocessors and moving into the computer market.

Gould and Mehdi Ali (then Commodore's managing director) have also been accused of causing the death of Commodore in 1993–94 by making a series of mistakes like trying to maximize profit by producing low-cost equipment and mismarketing the Amiga.

References

Bibliography

External links
 Irving Gould
 Ars history of Commodore 

20th-century Canadian businesspeople
Commodore people
1919 births
2004 deaths